Drymarchon melanurus erebennus, commonly known as the Texas indigo snake, is a subspecies of large, nonvenomous snake in the family Colubridae. The subspecies is native to Texas and adjacent Mexico.

Geographic range
D. m. erebennus is found from southern Texas south into Mexico as far as Veracruz.

Description
Dorsally, the Texas indigo snake is predominantly black in color, with a high sheen which gives its smooth scales a remarkable iridescent hue. The underside is often a salmon pink color. It is a large snake, regularly attaining a total length (including tail) beyond .

Habitat
The Texas indigo snake prefers lightly vegetated areas not far from permanent water sources, but is also found in mesquite savannah, open grassland areas, and coastal sand dunes. It dens in burrows left by other animals.

Behavior and diet
D. m. erebennus is diurnal, and spend most of its time actively hiding. It will consume almost anything it can overpower and swallow, including mammals, birds, lizards, frogs, turtles, eggs, and even other snakes, including rattlesnakes. Because of its aggressive attacks on rattlesnakes, many farmers in southern Texas consider it a useful ally. Hence the adage, "If it's an indigo, let it go."  It is not a typically aggressive snake, but may bite or release a foul smelling musk from its cloaca if handled or harassed. Like many colubrid snakes, it will often shake its tail as a warning – even though it does not possess a rattle.

Reproduction
Breeding of D. m. erebennus takes place, generally yearly, in the winter. Clutches that average 10–12 eggs are laid in the spring, and hatch around 80 days later. Maturity is reached in 2–3 years.

Conservation
The Texas indigo snake is listed as a threatened species by the state of Texas. Its primary threat is from habitat loss due to human development. Each snake requires a large home range to forage, and urban sprawl is shrinking its usable habitat. Roads bisect its territory, and many snakes each year are run over by cars.

References

Further reading

Werler, John E.; Dixon, James R. (2000). Texas snakes: Identification, Distribution, and Natural History. Austin, Texas: University of Texas Press. 522 pp. . (Texas indigo snake, pp. 98–102).
Crother BI, Boundy J, Campbell JA, de Quieroz K, Frost D, Green DM, Highton R, et al. (2003). "Scientific and standard English names of amphibians and reptiles of North America north of Mexico: Update". Herpetological Review 34: 196–203.

Colubrids
Snakes of North America
Reptiles of Mexico
Reptiles of the United States
Fauna of the Rio Grande valleys
Reptiles described in 1860
Taxa named by Edward Drinker Cope